Zbyněk Hampl (born March 22, 1988) is a Czech former professional ice hockey left winger. He played with HC Oceláři Třinec in the Czech Extraliga during the 2010–11 Czech Extraliga season.

References

External links 

1988 births
Living people
Anglet Hormadi Élite players
Boxers de Bordeaux players
Czech ice hockey left wingers
HC Havířov players
Hokej Šumperk 2003 players
SK Horácká Slavia Třebíč players
Les Aigles de Nice players
LHK Jestřábi Prostějov players
HC Oceláři Třinec players
HC Olomouc players
HC Slovan Ústečtí Lvi players
Sportspeople from Přerov
Czech expatriate sportspeople in France
Expatriate ice hockey players in France
Czech expatriate ice hockey people